Alcohol laws of Turkey regulate the sale and consumption of alcoholic beverages.

Background 

Rakı (Rakija) is a famous Balkan alcoholic beverage, and is a significant part of Turkey's food and drinking culture, a significant cultural-historical symbolic drink in many of its cities, and also the national drink of Turkey.

Alcohol consumption is just above 1.5 litres per person in Turkey, which is the lowest percentage in Europe by population, considering the high Turkish population. Turkey is a secular country, and even though the majority of the Turkish population is Muslim, the consumption of alcohol both in public and in private is very common.

Though due to this fact, issues such as alcohol addiction (alcoholism), and other serious issues caused by this factor are a problem in the country.

Consumption measures

Age limits
The sale and consumption of alcoholic beverages is age limited to persons 18 and over.

Drunk-driving
Turkey's driving under the influence law gives a blood alcohol content limit of 0.05 mg/ml and 0 for commercial drivers. Breaching the limit is punishable with a six-month driving ban.

Sales measures

Licensing
Licenses are required in Turkey to sell or serve alcohol, including beer. Alcohol can be sold in markets only between 6 am and 10 pm, but there is no time limit in restaurants, bars, etc. Student dormitories, health institutions, sports clubs, education institutions and some filling stations are prohibited from selling alcohol.

Licenses are given by the local municipalities and the Ministry of Culture and Tourism and Ministry of Health.

Tax

The high tax on the alcoholic beverages, called special consumption tax ( or ÖTV), was established first in 2002 and dramatically increased in 2010 by the government of the Justice and Development Party, whose leadership is known for their aversion to alcohol. For instance, the increase in prices of an average rakı, a traditional Turkish alcoholic beverage, was only slightly higher than the regular inflation, 204% to 206%, from 2003 when Justice and Development Party came into the office until 2012. However, between 2013 and 2020, the average price of rakı has far more exceeded the inflation of commodity prices, 359% to 213%, due to the high tax rates.

The high taxes on alcohol is related to a significant rise in smuggling and fraud involving alcoholic beverages in the country. Bootlegging is blamed for the alcohol poisoning in Turkey, including the 2011 Turkish Riviera mass alcohol poisoning and causality of at least 67 people to methyl alcohol poisoning in October 2020.

Advertising and promotion
In 2013, new laws banned most forms of advertising and promotion for alcoholic beverages on radio and television, including promoting such related sponsored activities, festivals and giveaways. Beverage companies ran ads criticizing the ban.

The law also included a requirement to blur depictions of alcoholic beverages on television and in television films, as was already done for cigarettes, and for bottles to carry health warnings similar to tobacco packaging warning messages. These laws did not affect online media, and significant protest grew against the ban on platforms such as Twitter, Facebook, Ekşi Sözlük and YouTube.

A 2011 ban by the Tobacco and Alcohol Market Regulatory Authority on advertising in sports meant the basketball team Efes Pilsen S.K had to change its name and rebrand as Anadolu Efes S.K., as the name “Efes Pilsen” was a company-branch group who owned the club within the Efes company, that is a significant and popular beverage company in Turkey and around Europe, which is still the club’s owner and main sponsor as of today.

Regulations 
The laws were regulated by the Tobacco and Alcohol Market Regulatory Authority until 24 December 2017. Since then the laws are regulated by Ministry of Agriculture and Forestry of Turkey.

Proposed new measures 
A governmental act imposed in January 2011 proposed restricting the sale of alcohol at certain events to persons under 24 years of age rather than the official and legal age of 18 as it was previously established. However, the restriction was later overturned by the courts and deemed unconstitutional.

See also 
 Secularism in Turkey
 Smoking in Turkey

References 

Law of Turkey
Alcohol in Turkey
Turkey
Religion in Turkey
Society of Turkey